Kinston Fire Station-City Hall is a historic fire station and city hall located at Kinston, Lenoir County, North Carolina. It was built in 1895, and is a two-story brick structure with a two-story rear wing built in several stages.  The main block has a sloping roof with raised parapet.  The building was renovated in 1987.  It houses the Caswell No. 1 Fire Station Museum.

It was listed on the National Register of Historic Places in 1989.

References

External links
VisitNC website

City and town halls on the National Register of Historic Places in North Carolina
Government buildings completed in 1895
Museums in Lenoir County, North Carolina
National Register of Historic Places in Lenoir County, North Carolina
Fire stations on the National Register of Historic Places in North Carolina
Firefighting museums in the United States